In late July 2022, Iran was hit by historic floods and mudslides which affected 400 towns and villages in 21 of Iran's 31 provinces, and destroyed over 20,000 homes. In the provinces of Mazandaran and Yazd, deaths were high. At least 95 people have been reported dead and over 200 others are missing.

Events 

On 11 July, rescue missions such as the Iranian Red Crescent went to help families in 51 villages in the Sistan and Baluchistan province.

On 6 August 2022, floods hit Imamzadeh.

See also 
 Great Iran Flood, a 1954 flood in Iran
 2022 Pakistan floods, a disaster that occurred in the same time period.

References 

July 2022 events in Iran
August 2022 events in Iran
2022 floods in Asia
Floods in Iran
2022 disasters in Iran